Tinyatoxin (TTX or TTN) is an analog of the neurotoxin resiniferatoxin. It occurs naturally in Euphorbia poissonii.

It is a neurotoxin that acts via full agonism of the vanilloid receptors of sensory nerves. Tinyatoxin has a potential for pharmaceutical uses similar to uses of capsaicin. Tinyatoxin is about one third as strong as resiniferatoxin but is still an ultrapotent analogue of capsaicin, with a heat intensity estimate of 300 to 350 times that of capsaicin.

References 

Plant toxins
Terpenes and terpenoids
Carboxylate esters
Orthoesters
Ion channel toxins
Benzyl compounds